Ronald T. Farrar (1935 – May 18, 2020) was an American journalist and academic. He was the chair of the Journalism Department at Southern Methodist University and University of Mississippi, and he later became the director of the School of Journalism at the University of Kentucky. He retired from academia as the Reynolds-Faunt Professor of Journalism at the University of South Carolina (USC) in 2001. He was the author of several academic books on journalism.

In 2011, he endowed the Ronald T. and Gayla D. Farrar Award for Media in Civil Rights History at USC.

Early life
Ronald T. Farrar was born in 1935 in Fordyce, Arkansas and died on May 18, 2020. He graduated from the University of Arkansas, where he earned a Bachelor of Science degree in business in 1957. He earned a master's degree in journalism from the University of Iowa in 1962, and a PhD in History and Journalism from the University of Missouri in 1965.

Career
Farrar began his career as a journalist in Arkansas, first as a reporter for the Arkansas Democrat in Little Rock, later as the news editor of the Daily Press in Paragould, and as the editor of the Trumann Democrat in Trumann. He also worked for The Daily Iowan.

Farrar joined the Journalism Department at Indiana University Bloomington as an assistant professor in 1964, and later became a tenured associate professor. He was the chair of the Journalism Department at Southern Methodist University from 1970 to 1973.

Farrar served as chair of the journalism department at the University of Mississippi from 1973 to 1977.

Farrar was the director of the School of Journalism at the University of Kentucky from 1977 to 1986. He became the Reynolds-Faunt Professor of Journalism at the University of South Carolina in 1986, and he retired from academia in 2001. In 2011, he endowed the Ronald T. and Gayla D. Farrar Award for Media in Civil Rights History at USC.

Personal life
Farrar was married to Gayle Hope Dennis. They had two children.

Selected works

References

1935 births
2020 deaths
People from Fordyce, Arkansas
University of Arkansas alumni
University of Iowa alumni
University of Missouri alumni
Indiana University Bloomington faculty
University of Mississippi faculty
University of South Carolina faculty